Kentucky Route 226 (KY 226) is a   rural, secondary state highway located entirely  in Grayson County, Kentucky.

Route description
It runs from Kentucky Route 259 in the Meredith community to Kentucky Route 88 in Peonia, both communities are southeast of Leitchfield.

Major intersections

References

0226
0226